Tentaoculus granulatus is a species of sea snail, deep-sea limpet, a marine gastropod mollusk in the family Pseudococculinidae .

Description
The length of the shell attains 3.8 mm.

Distribution
This small limpet occurs at methane seeps in deep water off the Congo River.

References

 Warén A. & Bouchet P. (2009). New gastropods from deep-sea hydrocarbon seeps off West Africa. Deep Sea Research Part II: Topical Studies in Oceanography 56(23): 2326-2349

Pseudococculinidae
Gastropods described in 2009